An ethnic Cajun, Don Rich (real name Donald Richard, pronounced ree-shard in the Cajun French manner) is a popular south Louisiana swamp pop singer.

Although younger than the original generation of swamp pop pioneers like Johnnie Allan, Rod Bernard, and Warren Storm, Rich has successfully worked his way into the top-tier of swamp pop musicians.  Along with Van Broussard, he arguably deserves much of the credit for the continued popularity of swamp pop on the east side of the Atchafalaya Basin, particularly in Louisiana parishes like Ascension, Assumption, Terrebonne and Lafourche.  Moreover, he has contributed to the resurgence of the genre in general, both in Louisiana and abroad.

Rich performs almost solely in southeastern Acadiana and has recorded several albums for Floyd Soileau's Jin Records of Ville Platte, Louisiana.  For many years he was a mainstay at Chilly Willy's on Lake Verret every Sunday night. Rich infuses both his swamp pop recordings and live performances with soul, rhythm and blues, and country and western influences.

References
Shane K. Bernard, Swamp Pop:  Cajun and Creole Rhythm and Blues (Jackson:  University Press of Mississippi, 1996).

Living people
American male singer-songwriters
American male pop singers
American rock musicians
American rock singers
Cajun musicians
Swamp pop music
Singer-songwriters from Louisiana
Year of birth missing (living people)